The University of Anbar is an Iraqi university in Ramadi, Al Anbar, Iraq. It was founded in 1987 with a college of education and a college of girls' education, and then expanded until it reached university status in 2011 with 19 colleges.

Colleges 
 College of Education of the Human Sciences. (History, Arabic Language, English Language, Geographic, Quran Sciences)
 College of Education, Pure Sciences. (Mathematics, Physics, Chemistry, Biology, Psychological Science)
 College of Science. (Mathematics, Physics, Chemistry, Biology)
 College of Engineering. (Mechanic, Civil, Electric, Dams and Water sources)
 College of Arts. (English Language, Arabic Language, History, Geographic, Sociology, Media)
 College of Law – Ramadi
 College of Computer Science and Information Technology
 College of Islamic Sciences – Ramadi (Hadith, Foqh, Quran Sciences, Islamic Faiths)
 College of Administrations and Economics – Ramadi
 College of Physical Education and Sport Sciences
 College of Medicine
 College of Dentistry
 College of Agriculture
 College of Education for Women
 College of Education – Al-Qa'im
 College of Veterinary Medicine
 College of Pharmacy

2014 hostage crisis 

On 7 June, gunmen linked to the Islamic State of Iraq and the Levant briefly took students at the university hostage after killing a number of guards and destroying "a bridge leading to the main gate". The crisis was resolved when students were permitted to leave several hours later, departing the campus in buses provided by the local government. No students were reported to have been injured during the incident.

References

External links
 https://www.uoanbar.edu.iq/
 https://www.uoanbar.edu.iq/English
 جامعة الأنبار 
 University of Anbar website 

Al Anbar Governorate
anbar
Educational institutions established in 1987
1987 establishments in Iraq